Danish Nawaz Baloch (born 4 August 1978) is a Pakistani television and film actor, director, and comedian. 

He has established a career in Pakistani television and is mostly famous as a comedian. 

He is best known for his lead comedy roles in the Nadaniyan, Extras: The Mango People and Larka Karachi Ka Kuri Lahore Di. 

Since 2016, he appears on popular sitcom Hum Sab Ajeeb Se Hain as Pasha.

Career 
He will also be seen doing a comic role in mahesh bhatt's upcoming horror-comedy venture. Since 2016, he has joined another sitcom, titled Hum Sab Ajeeb Se Hain which includes an ensemble cast of veteran comedians like Hina Dilpazeer, Shabbir Jan, Uroosa Siddiqui and others.

In an interview with The Express Tribune, when asked how it feels to bound yourself with one genre, Nawaz said ''I present myself as a comedy actor and I have no issues with doing comedy roles only. I'd rather do something that I'm really good at than do something so many other people are doing.''

Education 
He has completed his Mechanical Engineering degree from  Mehran University of Engineering & Technology Hyderabad, Pakistan.

Filmography

Television 
 Babu Jee Dheeray Chalna
 Chaar Chaand
 Extras (The Mango People) - (director, actor)
 Hum Tum - (cameo appearance in the last episode)
 Sub Set Hai
 Karwatain
 Larka Karachi Ka Kuri Lahore Di
 Masub Ki Dillagi
 Bachay mann ke sachay- (host)
 Miss Garam Masala - (director)
 Nadaaniyaan
 Naina
 O Meri Billi - (director, actor)
 Phir Chand Pe Dastak
 Shaali - (director)
 Tanveer Fatima (B.A)
 Cartoons 
 LUSH 
 Hum Sab Ajeeb Se Hain
 Sun Yaara - (director)
Ishq Tamasha - (director)
 Kabhi Band Kabhi Baja (Ep:11 Mohabbat Ka Maara)
 Khaas (director)
 Kashf  (director)
Chupke Chupke(director)
 Dr. Balma-Telefilm (director)
 Dobara (director)
 good morning pakistan show as a Guest
 Hum Tum - (director)

Films
 Wrong No. (2015)
Chain Aye Na (2017)
Wrong No.2 (2019)
''Chakkar (2022)

References

External links 
 
 

1978 births
Living people
Pakistani male television actors
Pakistani male comedians
Male actors from Karachi
Pakistani television directors
Baloch people
 Mehran University of Engineering & Technology alumni